Siva  Temple is a Siva temple in Gunavayil in Kerala, (India).

Vaippu Sthalam
It is one of the shrines of the Vaippu Sthalams sung by Tamil Saivite Nayanars Sambandar and Appar.

Silappatikaram
In Silappatikaram this place is referred as 'Gunavayil Kottam'.

Location
This place is located in the west of Kodungallur in Kerala.

References

Hindu temples in Kerala
Shiva temples in Kerala